Jeanne Herviale (24 December 1908 – 29 November 1989) was a French actress.  She appeared in 85 films and television shows between 1946 and 1989.

Partial filmography

 Mr. Orchid (1946) - Marie
 The Damned (1947) - La bonne du docteur (uncredited)
 Scandals of Clochemerle (1948) - Honorine
 Dieu a besoin des hommes (1950)
 Les joyeux pélerins (1951) - Béatrice, la directrice du couvent
 Judgement of God (1952) - (uncredited)
 Procès au Vatican (1952)
 Les affreux (1959)
 The Lovers of Teruel (1962)
 Trois enfants... dans le désordre (1966) - Une ménagère (uncredited)
 Is Paris Burning? (1966) - Minor Role (uncredited)
 Erotissimo (1969)
 I. You. They. (1969) - La vieille femme interviewée
 Elle court, elle court la banlieue (1973) - La propriétaire
 Themroc (1973) - Themroc's mother
 La gueule de l'emploi (1974)
 Le soleil qui rit rouge (1974) - Madame Holle
 Comment réussir quand on est con et pleurnichard (1974) - Maman Robineau
 Les noces de porcelaine (1975) - Marie
 C'est dur pour tout le monde (1975) - La concierge
 Maîtresse (1976) - Concierge
 Cours après moi... que je t'attrape (1976) - La dame perception
 Un mari, c'est un mari (1976) - Mme Lasblaise
 Armaguedon (1977) - La tenancière de l'hôtel d'Ostende
 La nuit de Saint-Germain-des-Prés (1977)
 Violette Nozière (1978) - La grand-mère
 Série noire (1979) - La tante
 A Little Romance (1979) - Woman in Metro Station
 Gros-Câlin (1979) - La concierge d'Irénée
 Deux lions au soleil (1980) - La logeuse
 Inspecteur la Bavure (1980) - Denise Morzini
 Du blues dans la tête (1981) - Miss Doudoune
 Toutes griffes dehors (1982, TV Mini-Series)
 Sweet Inquest on Violence (1982) - La vieille dame
 Deadly Circuit (1983) - Vittel's aunt
 Le jeune marié (1983) - Old lady
 Ave Maria (1984)
 La vengeance du serpent à plumes (1984) - la voisine attentionnee
 J'ai Rencontré Le Père Noël (1984) - Grandmother
 The Frog Prince (1985) - Madame Duclos
 Conseil de famille (1986)
 Dressage (1986) - Clémentine (la servante) (uncredited)
 Sale destin (1987) - La grand-mère d'Alexandre
 Les oreilles entre les dents (1987) - Lydie, la vieille folle
 Flag (1987) - La grand-mère de Nénesse
 Le diable rose (1988) - Clémentine

External links

1908 births
1989 deaths
French film actresses
Actresses from Paris
French television actresses
20th-century French actresses